Live!! +one is a live EP by British heavy metal band Iron Maiden. Initially released only in Japan on 25 December 1980, it was recorded live at the Marquee Club in London on 4 July 1980. The recordings of "Sanctuary" and "Drifter" were only ever issued on this EP, but the other two tracks have appeared as B-sides on subsequent singles.

In 1984 the EP was reissued in Greece with an expanded track listing, but only "I've Got the Fire" was actually recorded at the Marquee Club. The other additional tracks appeared on the Maiden Japan EP and "Prowler" was taken from the band's self-titled debut album.

Track listing

Japanese release

Greek release

Personnel
Paul Di'Anno – lead vocals
Dave Murray – guitar
Dennis Stratton - guitar, backing vocals (1980 recordings only)
Adrian Smith – guitar, backing vocals (1981 recordings only)
Steve Harris – bass guitar, backing vocals
Clive Burr – drums

References

1980 EPs
Live EPs
Iron Maiden live albums
Iron Maiden EPs
1980 live albums
Live heavy metal albums
Live albums recorded at The Marquee Club